Gods is a platform game by The Bitmap Brothers released for the Amiga and Atari ST in 1991. The player is cast as Hercules in his quest to achieve immortality. It was ported to the Acorn Archimedes, Genesis/Mega Drive, PC98, and Super Nintendo Entertainment System.

Plot
According to the game's own introduction, "four guardians" have invaded and usurped the citadel of the gods. The gods offer any hero who can succeed in retaking the citadel one favor. The hero who comes forth immediately asks the gods as their favor to be granted a seat among them as an equal. The gods are only comforted by the hope the hero fails. After the last boss is beaten, the gods prove true to their word and the last image is the hero's body becoming a being of light as he ascends to Mount Olympus.

Gameplay
Although Gods might seem like a "jump and run" platformer, in this game while precise and timed jumping are required to progress, planning each move carefully yields better results health-wise than attempting to rush through a level, and there are some puzzles (often involving levers and objects) which require the player to go back and forth in the level, since there is only a four-space inventory where objects required to get bonuses (such as keys) or to complete a level can be carried. The console versions (particularly the Mega Drive/Genesis version) run at a considerably higher speed, which increases the difficulty level. A Game Boy Advance version was also in development but cancelled. The console versions do not share the same opening theme music as the PC versions of the game. They do, however, have background music throughout the game, which is notably missing in the PC versions (The PC version only has background music throughout the game with a Roland LAPC-I).

There are several weapons available in the levels or to buy, and up to three of each can be used simultaneously. It is also possible to vary the focus of the weapons: to destroy more enemies at the same horizontal level as the player, a tight angle is advisable, but in levels with open spaces and enemies in higher places, a diffuse aim might prove more useful. There are also other weapons, such as bouncing axes that can be used to take on enemies at a lower level or fireballs.

The enemy AI was praised - it would adapt not only to the player position, but also to their skill. Some rooms contain inaccessible items - smaller "thieves" show up from a passage in the wall, try to grab the item and bring it back to another point in the room or disappear with it. The player is able to obtain the item if they shoot the thief at the correct time. Bonuses are awarded for reaching certain parts of the level under a certain limit of time or number of lives, bringing an object to a room or simply by playing poorly, where the game helps the player.

There are four levels, each with a Guardian at the end. After completion of a level the player meets a trader, and depending on the wealth accumulated during the game (by catching diamond-shaped jewels or bags) can buy more powerful weapons or items (Xenon 2 Megablast uses the same idea).

Reception

As was common with Bitmap Brothers, an external musician assured the game score, this time John Foxx as Nation 12. The box cover illustration was designed by the British comic book artist Simon Bisley. The graphics were designed using the SpriteFX application. Like other Bitmap Brothers' games, Gods was highly praised by critics thanks to the quality graphics and music.

Computer Gaming World in 1992 named it one of the year's top four action games for "fast and furious arcade-style action [and] enough exploration and puzzle-solving to raise it above the typical action crowd".

Legacy
A remastered version of the game, Gods Remastered, was developed by Robot Riot Games and released on 4 December 2018 for Microsoft Windows. It was then announced for Xbox and Steam, and released December 2019, followed by Nintendo Switch and PS4, with 29 March 2020 given as the release date for the latter platforms. Licensing restrictions prevented the distribution of this remastered edition past 27 March 2022.

References

External links

Gods Atari ST version review, 1992

Platform games
1991 video games
Amiga games
DOS games
Atari Jaguar games
Atari ST games
Acorn Archimedes games
NEC PC-9801 games
Sega Genesis games
Super Nintendo Entertainment System games
Video games scored by David Whittaker
Video games scored by Richard Joseph
Video games developed in the United Kingdom
Video games set in antiquity
Video games based on Greek mythology
Single-player video games
Mindscape games
The Bitmap Brothers games